is a four-panel gag manga by Risa Itō about a small yellow bird with a beard, who ends up as a pet of a boy named Hiroshi. Serialized between 2004 and 2006 in Shueisha's Chorus magazine, the series was later compiled into a single volume on January 12, 2007. It was later adapted into an anime television series, which premiered on 3 April 2009, directed by Atsushi Takeyama, written by Natsuko Takahashi and with music by Toshio Masuda. The anime adaptation later inspired the creation of a spin-off manga series, published in Ribon magazine.

References

External links
 
 
 Anime website (Japanese)

2009 anime television series debuts
Fictional chickens
Kinema Citrus
NHK original programming
Shueisha franchises
Shueisha manga